Drahomíra Smolíková (born 12 January 1959) is a Czech gymnast. She competed in six events at the 1976 Summer Olympics.

References

1959 births
Living people
Czech female artistic gymnasts
Olympic gymnasts of Czechoslovakia
Gymnasts at the 1976 Summer Olympics
Sportspeople from Ostrava